Teddy Bear Hospital (TBH) is an international project, whose aim is to reduce childhood anxiety about medical environments, procedures and professionals. TBH exists at 21 Medical Schools in the UK at 8 Medical Schools in Australia and 2 medical schools in Ireland, one Medical School in Israel, NUIG and more recently University of Limerick.

Unlike other projects in the country, St George's University of London TBH is not operated as a project under Medsin, it is considered its own society. It is run by a dedicated committee of 6-8 people and has trained over 400 Teddy Bear Doctors, each of whom has been CRB checked and holds a NSPCC Child Protection Awareness Certificate.

Projects run by TBH at St George's, University of London:
Talks/lectures promoting child health (FGM Talk)
Fundraising (Fun Run, Harrod’s donations for Paeds wards)
Puppet Shows
Clinics

The clinics are the main focus of the society and form the main method of achieving its aim. Clinics have been run for schools, beaver scouts, brownie groups and Student Action for refugees’ after-school club in South West London since March 2009 and regularly receive outstanding feedback. The society currently offers 12 stations for clinics.  They use a creative and multi-sensory approach, which is inclusive for all children.
The majority of the time is spent with the children doing various tasks, for example building a large jigsaw of the skeleton, or learning how to use stethoscopes.  Aspects of the stations complement or cover parts of the KS1/KS2 curriculum, in particular PHSE.  Children are asked to bring along a teddy tear to the clinic on which new skills are learnt and practised. If the Teddy Bear is already sick, its even better!

SGUL Teddy Bear Hospital ran the first Community Day in 2018, held at St George's, University of London, where members of the public were invited to attend with their children to get involved and explore the stations on offer. It was successful in providing another method for TBH to engage the local community in Tooting in life at the hospital and university.

Stations on offer at clinics:
X-Ray
First Aid
Smoothie making and healthy living
Safety
Stethoscopes
Eye and Ear
Asthma
Vital Signs
Ambulance
Exercise
Scrubbing and Infection Control
Surgery

Talks
The FGM talk took place at St George's University London in 2009.  With a large number of people attending, it was informative and increased awareness on the topic.

Fundraising
As well as fundraising within St George's Hospital and the university, TBH have also organised other, larger, events for example the TBH Fun Run in Hyde Park in May 2010

References

External links 
 Facebook Page

Teddy bears